The 2016–17 First League of the Republika Srpska was the twenty-second season of the First League of the Republika Srpska, the second tier football league of Bosnia and Herzegovina, since its original establishment and the fifteenth as a second-tier league.

Clubs 

 FK Borac Banja Luka
 FK Borac Šamac
 FK Drina Zvornik
 FK Kozara Gradiška
 FK Podrinje Janja
 FK Rudar Prijedor
 FK Slavija Istočno Sarajevo
 FK Sloboda Mrkonjić Grad
 FK Sloga Doboj
 FK Sutjeska Foča
 FK Tekstilac Derventa
 FK Zvijezda 09 Etno Selo Stanišići

Regular season

Promotion round

Relegation round

Season statistics

Top goalscorers

See also
2016–17 Premier League of Bosnia and Herzegovina
2016–17 First League of the Federation of Bosnia and Herzegovina
2016–17 Bosnia and Herzegovina Football Cup

References

External links
League statistics at SportSport.ba
Official site for the Football Federation of Bosnia and Herzegovina
Official site for the Football Federation of the Republika of Srpska

 

Bos
2
First League of the Republika Srpska seasons